Walker, Texas Ranger is an American action crime television series created by Leslie Greif and Paul Haggis. It was inspired by the film Lone Wolf McQuade, with both this series and that film starring Chuck Norris as a member of the Texas Ranger Division. The show aired on CBS in the spring of 1993, with the first season consisting of three pilot episodes. Eight full seasons followed with new episodes airing from September 25, 1993, to May 19, 2001, and reruns continuing on CBS until July 28, 2001. It has been broadcast in over 100 countries and spawned a 2005 television film entitled Trial by Fire. The film ended on a cliffhanger, which was never resolved. DVD sets of all seasons have been released (with the three pilots packaged with the first regular season). At various times since 1997, reruns of the show have aired, in syndication, on the USA Network and Action in Canada. Reruns are currently seen on CBS Action, WGN America, CMT, INSP, getTV, Pluto TV, Heroes & Icons, and Grit, 10 Bold, and being part of Network Ten in Australia.
The series was noted for its moralistic style. The characters refrained from the use of drugs and participated in community service. Martial arts were displayed prominently as the primary tool of law enforcement and occasionally as a tool for Walker and company to reach out to the community.

Premise
The show was initially developed by executive producer Allison Moore and supervising producer J. Michael Straczynski when the series was still being produced by Cannon Television. While Straczynski had to depart to get his new series Babylon 5 on the air, executive producer David Moessinger remained to finish developing the series. The show is centered on Sergeant Cordell Walker (Norris), a Dallas–Fort Worth–based member of the Texas Rangers, a state-level bureau of investigation. Walker was raised by his paternal uncle, an American Indian named Ray Firewalker (Floyd Red Crow Westerman, pilot episode, season 1; Apesanahkwat, season 2). The surname being, possibly, a nod to the 1986 Norris film, Firewalker. Cordell, prior to joining the Rangers, served in the Marines' elite Recon unit during the Vietnam War. Both Cordell and Uncle Ray share the values characteristic of Wild West sheriffs.

His partner and best friend is James "Jimmy" Trivette (Clarence Gilyard), a former Dallas Cowboys player, "Go Long Trivette", who takes a more modern approach. Walker's young partner grew up in Baltimore and used football as his ticket to college education. He was dropped from the team after he tore up his shoulder in a major game, which led to his career in the Rangers (often making references to watching the Lone Ranger and how C.D. Parker mentored him as a rookie officer). Trivette also works inside the office using computers and cellular phones to collate information of the people who have been taken into custody.

Walker also works closely with (and shares a mutual attraction to) Alexandra "Alex" Cahill (Sheree J. Wilson), a Tarrant County Assistant District Attorney, who on occasion puts up a frown if Walker does not obtain results in time. He also gets advice on cases from C.D. Parker (Gailard Sartain, pilot season; Noble Willingham, seasons 1–7), a veteran Ranger (later inducted into the Texas Rangers Hall of Fame) who worked with Walker (and is the only character on the show to address Walker by his first name Cordell on a regular basis) until retiring to operate a small restaurant and bar called "CD's Bar and Grill", a restaurant widely known in the series for its chili. In season 7, two rookie Texas Rangers, Sydney Cooke (Nia Peeples), and Francis Gage (Judson Mills), are assigned under Walker and Trivette's command.

The series was well known during its run for its product placement deal with Chrysler, especially its Dodge division. After Walker used a GMC Sierra during the first season, he switched to the Dodge Ram (which at the start of the second season was completely redesigned for 1994), which would be advertised during commercial breaks. Other members of the cast often used other Chrysler vehicles, while villains would drive vehicles from General Motors or Ford Motor Company. This was not unlike The Andy Griffith Show, which exclusively used Ford vehicles due to a sponsorship deal with Andy Griffith. Coincidentally, the show ended just as Dodge was getting ready to redesign the Ram again for the 2002 model year. However the 2006 Dodge Ram SRT-10 was used in the movie Trial by Fire, driven by Walker.

Episodes

Cast and characters

Main
 Chuck Norris as Texas Ranger Sergeant Cordell Walker, a former Marine and a modern-day Ranger who believes in the Code of the Old West. He is a decorated Vietnam vet and a martial arts expert. He is the show's main protagonist.
 Clarence Gilyard as Texas Ranger Sergeant James "Jimmy" Trivette, Walker's partner and best friend. A former professional football player for the Dallas Cowboys.
 Sheree J. Wilson as Tarrant County Assistant D.A. Alexandra "Alex" Cahill, whom Walker dates for a few seasons and finally marries.
 Noble Willingham (Gailard Sartain in the series pilot) as retired Texas Ranger Captain C.D. Parker, Walker's buddy and ex-partner who owns a bar-restaurant in Fort Worth, Texas, and is the only one to address Walker by his first name Cordell regularly. C.D. regularly came out of retirement to assist Walker and Trivette.
 Floyd Westerman (Apesanahkwat in a season 2 guest appearance) as Walker's paternal uncle Ray Firewalker, also known as Uncle Ray. He raised Cordell after his parents – John and Elizabeth Firewalker – were murdered. Ray disappears at the end of the second season and is revealed to have died a few seasons later.
 Marco Sanchez as Detective Carlos Sandoval, a detective for Dallas PD, and the best friend of Trent Malloy. He often teams up with Walker and Trivette on cases. Sanchez recurs in seasons 4–5, and is part of the main cast in season 6.
 Jimmy Wlcek as Trent Malloy, son of a pastor and former martial arts student of Walker. He is a black belt in Karate and runs both his own Dojo and Protection Agency. He also often teams up with Walker and Trivette on cases. Wlcek recurs in seasons 4–5, and is part of the main cast in season 6.
 Nia Peeples as Texas Ranger Sydney "Syd" Cooke, a rookie Ranger who joins Walker in the series' seventh season.
 Judson Mills as Texas Ranger Francis Gage, another rookie Ranger who joins Walker in the series' seventh season.

Supporting
 Cynthia Dorn as M.E. Mary Williams, a medical examiner in most of the murder cases that occurred on the show.
 James Drury as Texas Ranger Captain Tom Price, Walker's and Trivette's supervisor. He only appears during the first season.
 Vanessa Paul as Josie Martin, who runs a 'H.O.P.E.' center created by Alex after a near-death experience. One of Alex's bridesmaids at Alex and Walker's wedding.
 Frank Salsedo as White Eagle, the spiritual leader of the Cherokee reservation Walker grew up on, who debuts during season 3.
 Rod Taylor as Gordon Cahill, the once-estranged father of Alex, who is also an Attorney.
 Eloy Casados as Sheriff Sam Coyote, the sheriff of the Cherokee reservation and a very good friend of Walker.
 Peter Onorati as Sergeant Vincent Rosetti, a New York Police Sergeant with a strong New York accent, and who is a little arrogant.
 Terry Kiser as Charlie Brooks, a clumsy and fast-talking informant for Walker and Trivette.
 Robert Fuller as Ranger Wade Harper, a retired El Paso Texas Ranger who came on board to work for Walker and Trivette. Previously, Robert Fuller appeared another character – Cabe Wallace, a 19th century Texas Ranger – in one episode.
 Julia Nickson as Dr. Susan Lee.

Reception

Nielsen ratings
The show was quite successful in the ratings throughout its run, ranking among the Top 25 shows from 1995 until 1999, and ranking in the Top 20 in both the 1995–1996 and 1998–1999 seasons.
1993–1994: 11.7 rating, No. 41
1994–1995: 11.2 rating, No. 41
1995–1996: 12.3 rating, No. 18
1996–1997: 11.0 rating, No. 24
1997–1998: 14.4 million viewers, No. 21
1998–1999: 14.4 million viewers, No. 15
1999–2000: 12.2 million viewers, No. 34
2000–2001: 10.3 million viewers, No. 62

Critical reception
In October 1993, Ken Tucker of Entertainment Weekly gave the series a C+.

Critic "Average Joe" Queenan thoroughly roasted the series, particularly over targeting a wider audience than suited for its late-night timeslot. He called the show "...so corny and predictable that it appears to be in slow-motion even when it's not...With plotlines that were old when George Burns was young, acting that makes William Shatner seem like Marlon Brando, and dialogue that could stop The Dukes of Hazzard dead in its tracks...Most episodes of the series are completely unwatchable -- although, to the producers' credit, many are scripted so that Chuck Norris doesn't need to talk much...While Norris indeed has a number of successful and well-received films to his credit, here is the first and only time I recall that he was trusted with performing his own theme music. He is no Roy Orbison...I'm not sure they're even using a DP on this show; it seems that they just mount a camera on a tripod and tell Chuck to start kicking people's faces in for a solid hour, which he seems more than willing to do."

Recognition
On December 2, 2010, Rick Perry the 47th Governor of Texas named the Norris brothers Honorary Texas Ranger Captains for their work on the series.  In his speech he said that "together, they helped elevate our Texas Rangers to truly mythical status."

Home media
Paramount Home Entertainment and CBS Home Entertainment have both released all seasons on DVD in Region 1. The Complete 1st Season contains the three pilot episodes and the first full season being labeled as just the first season. This has confused some fans, as the episodes are wrongly numbered. Seasons 1–6 have been released in regions 2–4.

On May 12, 2015, CBS DVD released Walker, Texas Ranger – The Complete Collection on DVD in Region 1.

Spin-offs and merchandise

Television films

CBS broadcast the television film Walker, Texas Ranger: Trial by Fire, produced by Paramount Network Television (now CBS Studios), on October 16, 2005. Chuck Norris, Sheree J. Wilson and Judson Mills reprised their roles, and Clarence Gilyard shot a cameo for the film but was not featured due to the filming's conflict with a long-planned family vacation. To fill the void, Judson Mills, who was not in the original script, returned to reprise the role of Francis Gage. Nia Peeples, who played the role of Sydney Cooke for seasons 7 and 8, was also not featured in Walker's return to prime-time television. The explanation given was that producers decided not to follow much of the original Walker Texas Ranger series, as to give the film a fresh look. Even the show's original opening credits with the theme "Eyes of a Ranger" performed by Chuck Norris, was absent from the TV movie.

Although the return of Walker Texas Ranger did not garner the ratings CBS had hoped for, indications were that CBS was green-lighting future Walker Texas Ranger "movie of the week" projects. But as of spring 2006, both CBS and the Norris camp have been silent as to the future of the franchise, leaving many to wonder if it will return. Trial by Fire ended with Sheree J. Wilson's character the victim of a courthouse shooting, leaving many viewers to believe that there would be a follow-up movie.

When they announced their fall 2006 prime-time schedule, CBS said that they would no longer be producing "Sunday Night Movie of the Week" projects, which severely impaired any hopes of Walker's return to television in the foreseeable future. On May 15, 2007, CBS announced its fall line-up, but this did not include the return of the "Sunday Night Movie of the Week". In June 2018, cast members Clarence Gilyard and Sheree J. Wilson expressed interest in reprising their roles in a potential revival of the series, particularly to address the cliffhanger at the end of the post-series film.

Spin-off

Most episodes were based on true stories. A short-lived series, Sons of Thunder, featured recurring character Carlos Sandoval, who resigns from his post with the Dallas police and teams up with childhood friend Trent Malloy (a protégé of Walker's), to start a private investigation firm.

Reboot

In September 2019, it was announced that a reboot of the series titled Walker was in development at CBS Television Studios from writer Anna Fricke, with Texas native Jared Padalecki attached to star. Fricke and Padalecki are also set to executive produce the project alongside Dan Lin and Lindsey Libertore from their production company Rideback, as well as Dan Spilo of Industry Entertainment. The CW, home of Padalecki's long-running series Supernatural, emerged as a leading contender to air the series in addition to CBS, which aired the original series. Like the original, the reboot, in which Walker would get a female partner, will explore morality, family, and rediscovering our lost common ground. The logline reads:

In October, it was announced that Walker would air on The CW. On January 14, 2020, it was announced that The CW had issued the reboot with a series order.

In February 2020, it was announced that Lindsey Morgan, Keegan Allen, Mitch Pileggi, Molly Hagan and Coby Bell were cast as Micki, Walker's female partner, Liam Walker, Walker's younger brother, Bonham Walker, Walker’s father, Abeline Walker, Walker’s mother and Captain Larry James, a Texas Ranger Captain. In March 2020, Jeff Pierre, Violet Brinson and Kale Culley were cast as Trey Barnett, an Army medic and Micki's boyfriend and Stella and August, Walker's teenage kids.

It premiered on January 21, 2021.

A prequel series titled Walker: Independence will premiere in fall 2022.

Novels
Three Walker, Texas Ranger books, written by James Reasoner, were published by Berkley Publishing Group in 1999. The books are now out of print.
 Walker, Texas Ranger (1998)
 Hell's Half Acre (1999)
 Siege on the Belle (1999)

In other media
The show has garnered a particular cult appreciation among Conan O'Brien fans, from one of his most popular segments called the "Walker Texas Ranger Lever". He explained since NBC had recently purchased Universal, he could now show clips from Walker Texas Ranger without having to pay any money. The joke was that he would pull a giant red lever, causing a random and comically awkward scene to play. Random scenes included Walker jumping out of a plane and punching a woman in the face, or being shot in the back while proposing, or Haley Joel Osment playing a boy who is first meeting the rest of Walker's friends, and suddenly interjects "Walker told me I have AIDS". Conan would go on to riff at the bizarre nature of the scene out of context. He did this primarily on Late Night With Conan O'Brien, which prompted the show's star, Chuck Norris in character as Walker, to make a surprise guest appearance by acting out a skit in parody of the action scenes from Walker, Texas Ranger.

Notable guest stars

Companies
The series began with Cannon Television, but after Cannon folded, CBS assumed production responsibilities and is currently the full owner for this series. Other companies as listed below have also been involved with the series production and/or distribution.

See also

Walker Texas Ranger 3: Deadly Reunion
Diagnosis: Murder – A show starring Dick Van Dyke that also ran for eight seasons between 1993 and 2001.

References

External links

Official Website

Spike TV acquires rights to Walker Texas Ranger
INSP Network acquires syndication rights to Walker Texas Ranger
Interviews and behind-the-scenes footage from Walker, Texas Ranger

1990s American crime drama television series
1990s American legal television series
1990s American police procedural television series
1990s Western (genre) television series
1993 American television series debuts
2000s American crime drama television series
2000s American legal television series
2000s American police procedural television series
2000s Western (genre) television series
2001 American television series endings
American action television series
CBS original programming
English-language television shows
Martial arts television series
Television series about prosecutors
Television series about the Texas Ranger Division
Television series by CBS Studios
Television series by Sony Pictures Television
Television series created by Paul Haggis
Television shows filmed in Texas
Television shows set in Dallas
Television shows set in Fort Worth, Texas
Television shows set in Texas
Neo-Western television series